The Penn State University Athletic Conference is a member conference of the United States Collegiate Athletic Association.  It comprises 14 of the Commonwealth Campuses of Pennsylvania State University.

History
The PSUAC joined the United States Collegiate Athletic Association (USCAA) since the 2008–09 academic year.

Member schools

Current members

Notes

Sports

See also 
 Hudson Valley Intercollegiate Athletic Conference
 Yankee Small College Conference
 Community college

External links
 Official website

Pennsylvania State University
College sports conferences in the United States
College sports in Pennsylvania
+
United States Collegiate Athletic Association